Four Seasons Resort Lanai is a Four Seasons resort hotel located in Lanai City on the island of Lānai, the smallest and least inhabited of Hawaii's six major islands that once was recognized for its pineapple plantation. The island of Lānai hosts two other hotels, Sensei Lanai, A Four Seasons Resort (previously known as "The Lodge at Koele"), and Hotel Lanai, a 3-star boutique hotel.

Originally opened as The Manele Bay Hotel in 1991, the hotel started operating under the Four Seasons brand in 2005. After it underwent a major renovation from 2012 to 2016, the Four Seasons Resort Lanai was reopened in February 2016. It features 168 rooms and 45 suites, and a golf course designed by Jack Nicklaus.

History

Manele Bay

The Mānele Bay Resort was built in 1991, the year that marked the island of Lānai's last harvest of pineapple, which was started in the 1920s by James Dole, dubbed as King of Pineapple. Over the following decades, the island became a major supplier, and in some years its production was accounted for 75% of the world's production of pineapple. However, only a few years after it bought the Dole Corporation, Castle & Cooke announced its intentions of transforming the island into a luxury resort destination, and in 1985, after being acquired by David Murdock, Castle & Cooke started taking serious steps for the new development plan. Construction began a few years later and the Lodge at Koele was built and opened in 1990, followed by The Mānele Bay in the next year.

Four Seasons Resort Lanai

The hotel came under the management of Four Seasons in 2005. When it was reopened in 2005 under the new brand, the hotel reflected a combination of Polynesian and Hawaiian designs, along with many rooms that had large lanais and views of Hulopoe Beach, which offered snorkeling.

In 2012, Oracle co-founder Larry Ellison bought 98% of the island from Castle & Cooke for a reported $300 million, with the remaining 2% owned by the state. After buying the island, Ellison decided to transform the Manele Bay into a luxury resort at a cost of $450 million. It took years of work and a seven-month closure before it was completed in February 2016, with the hotel's lobby being redesigned three times. It featured rooms that were designed by Todd-Avery Lenahan.

Property
Four Seasons Resort Lanai currently houses 213 guest rooms, including 45 private suites. Other amenities include spa services, pools, and fitness facilities. It has three meeting rooms that have  of space and are able to hold up to 560 people. It includes a Nobu restaurant, which is a restaurant chain run by chef Nobu Matsuhisa; Ellison owns another Nobu restaurant in Malibu.

The resort was constructed with a 7,039-yard, par-72 championship premier golf course, which was designed by Jack Nicklaus.

Rating and awards
Four Seasons Resort Lanai is ranked by the AAA as a Five Diamond Resort, while ONE Forty Restaurant ranked it as a Four Diamond Restaurant. It is also ranked as a 5-Star Resort by Forbes Travel Guide (formerly Mobil).

It was named #1 hotel in the United States by the U.S. News & World Report in their 2018 and 2020 lists. It was listed on Robb Report's Best of the Best 2016-Journeys. The golf course received Golf Digest's Editors’ Choice Award for Best in Travel 2018.

The Lodge at Koele

Eight miles away, The Lodge at Kōele was built in 1990 and became a Four Seasons in 2005. It was closed in January 2015 to be renovated. It opened in November 2019 as Sensei Lanai, a wellness resort with 92 rooms and 4 suites. At the time it was Four Seasons' first adults-only wellness resort.

References

External links
 Four Seasons Resort Lānai

Hotels in Hawaii
Resorts in Hawaii
Golf clubs and courses in Hawaii
Seaside resorts in Hawaii
Buildings and structures in Maui County, Hawaii
Tourist attractions in Maui County, Hawaii
Four Seasons hotels and resorts
Hotels established in 1991
Hotel buildings completed in 1991
1991 establishments in Hawaii